Košarkarski klub Parklji, commonly referred to as KK Parklji or simply Parklji, was a basketball team based in Ljubljana, Slovenia. The club was founded in 1993 and folded in late 2019.

References

Basketball teams established in 1993
Basketball teams in Slovenia
Sports clubs in Ljubljana
1993 establishments in Slovenia
Basketball teams disestablished in 2019
2019 disestablishments in Slovenia